Radogoszcz may refer to the following places in Poland:
Radogoszcz, Lower Silesian Voivodeship (south-west Poland)
Radogoszcz, Pomeranian Voivodeship (north Poland)
Radogoszcz prison in Nazi-occupied Lodz
Radegast station (in ), railway station built by the Nazis at the outskirts of the Lodz ghetto
Radogoszcz, Łódź -district (part) of Łódź
Radgosc